

History
The Niagara Power is a collegiate summer baseball franchise which currently competes in the Perfect Game Collegiate Baseball League, a league designed to give college-eligible players an opportunity to compete while furthering their development and being scouted for professional consideration. Their home games are played at Sal Maglie Stadium in Niagara Falls, New York.

The Power was established in 2007 by its first president and owner, Cal Kern, who operated the team in affiliation with the Fellowship of Christian Athletes. The Power, upon its inception, entered and competed in the New York Collegiate Baseball League. The team remained in the league until the conclusion of the 2015 season, after which Kern ceased operations. 

The team was restored in 2018 under new ownership, the College of Hospitality, Sport & Tourism Management at Niagara University. Under the direction of Dr. Patrick Tutka, who assumed the role of team president, Niagara University ran the team with a model by which students handled almost all facets of game-day operations. The Power returned to the NYCBL in 2018, winning the league's championship in the 2019 season. 

After the COVID pandemic forced the cancellation of the 2020 baseball season, the Power returned in 2021 but had switched leagues, leaving the NYCBL to join the PGCBL.

Following the 2021 season, Dr. Tutka stepped down from the team. NU continued to operate the team in 2022 under the direction of the College of Hospitality, Sport & Tourism Management's dean, Bridget Niland. Upon the conclusion of the 2022 season, local businessman John DiCarlo has assumed ownership of the Power.

Season-by-season record

References

External links
Niagara Power official website
New York Collegiate Baseball League official website
Perfect Game Collegiate Baseball League official website

Amateur baseball teams in New York (state)
Baseball teams established in 2007
2007 establishments in New York (state)
Niagara University